Flexor brevis muscle may refer to:
Foot
Flexor digiti minimi brevis muscle (foot)
Flexor digitorum brevis muscle
Flexor hallucis brevis muscle
Hand
Flexor digiti minimi brevis muscle (hand)
Flexor pollicis brevis muscle